Thayer Monument is a white granite monument and statue of Sylvanus Thayer at the United States Military Academy, designed by sculptor Carl Conrads and unveiled on June 11, 1883. Thayer is known as the "Father of the Military Academy" for the profound and lasting impact of his superintendency during the academy's early years.  The monument's location has changed over the years.  It first occupied the southwest corner of the Plain, but it currently sits at the intersection of Washington and Jefferson roads, adjacent to the Beat Navy tunnel on the northwest corner of the Plain.  The memorial is the sight of multiple memorial ceremonies during the year as West Point reunions hold a parade and memorial service at the site.  Tradition states that the oldest living graduate of the senior reunion class present will lay a wreath at the statue.

References

Sculptures by Carl Conrads
Monuments and memorials at West Point
1883 sculptures
1883 establishments in New York (state)
Granite sculptures in New York (state)